is a Japanese tokusatsu TV show and is the 7th show in the Ultra Series. Produced by Tsuburaya Productions and Steve Krantz Productions, Ultraman Leo was aired between April 12, 1974, and March 28, 1975, with a total of 51 episodes. Tatsumi Nikamoto was the in-suit actor of Ultraman Leo.

Plot

Ultraman Leo comes from Nebula L77 (Leo constellation), and takes the human form of Gen Ootori. Ultraseven appears to fight a new foe, Alien Magma and his two "pets", the Red and Black Giras. Ultimately, Ultraseven is greatly overpowered and his leg is graphically broken by Black Giras. Ultraman Leo drives off the foes, but Ultraseven is confined to his human form because of his injuries and due to the Ultra Eye being damaged when he attempted to transform. Dan then maintains his role as Captain of MAC (Monster Attack Crew). Gen is a gymnastics teacher on the side and joins MAC to defend the Earth. Gen and Dan regularly train together, allowing Ultraman Leo to learn many moves in human form. In episode 34, Dan asks Ultraman Jack to take the Ultra Eye back to M78 to be restored while he heals on Earth. However, in episode 40 MAC is destroyed by Silver Bloome, a saucer monster that belongs to Commander Black. During the attack Dan asks Leo to keep defending the Earth and disappears in the conflagration. It is later shown that he was taken back to M78 to be fully healed and restored as Ultraseven. Gen is now unemployed and spends most of his time training the kids to defend themselves as well as defending the Earth as Ultraman Leo. Commander Black and Alien Bunyo capture Gen when he cannot transform completely. Gen as Leo is then dismembered, only to be brought back to life by Ultraman King. Leo would then face Commander Black's final monster, Black End, with the kids he trained, the latter of whom kill Black, and hand the sphere used to control Black End to Leo. Finishing his mission, Gen removes his Leo Ring and sets off to tour Earth, his "second home".

Episodes
 When Seven Dies! Tokyo Submerges!
 The Big Sink! The Last Day of the Japanese Archipelago
 Goodbye Tears...
 A Vow Between Men
 Don't Cry! You Are a Man
 You're a Man! Burn On!
 A Beautiful Man's Disposition
 Certain Kill! Monster Challenger
 Bridge of Friendship That Spans Space
 The Wandering Monster of Sorrow
 One Man Covered with Mud
 The Travellin' Dude Has Come!
 Huge Explosion! A Desperate Couple of Aliens
 Certain-Kill Fists! A Young Boy Who Calls Up a Tempest
 The Way to Kill in Darkness! The One Strike with Fighting Spirit
 The Woman Who Disappeared in the Middle of the Night
 Bride of the Wolfman
 Vampire! The Bat Girl
 The Revival of the Half-Fish Man
 The Strange Lad of Ursa Minor
 I Saw a Goddess in the Far North!
 The Leo Brothers vs. The Monster Brothers
 The Mischievous Alien Who Fell Out of Bed
 The Beautiful Woman of Virgo
 The Rhinoceros Beetle is a Space Invader!
 Ultraman King vs. the Magician
 You're Strong! Momotaroh!
 Return of the Bearded Captain!
 Reunion of Fate! Dan and Anne
 The Returning of a Monster's Favor
 The White Flower that Protects Earth
 Farewell, Princess Kaguya
 The Leo Brothers vs. the Evil Space Spirit Alien
 Ultra Brothers, Eternal Vows
 I'm a Monster General!
 Fly! Leo Brothers, Save the Space Base!
 Mystery! The Mirror in Which a Devil Lives
 Battle! The Leo Brothers vs. The Ultra Brothers
 The Leo Brothers and the Ultra Brothers, Time of Victory
 MAC Annihilated! The Flying Saucer was a Living Creature!
 A Flying Saucer Beast Came from an Evil Planet!
 Leo is in Danger! The Assassin is a Flying Saucer Beast
 Challenge! The Terror of the Vampire Saucer
 The Shooting Star from Hell!
 The Phantom Girl
 The Fighting Leo Brothers! The End of the Flying Saucer Beast!
 The Evil Stardust-Collecting Girl
 The Giant Monster Bird Saucer Attacks the Japanese Archipelago!
 The Red Assassin Who Beckons Death!
 The Life of Leo! The Miracle of King!
 Goodbye, Leo! Take off Toward the Sun

Cast
: .
: 
: 
: .
: 
: 
: 
: 
: 
: 
: 
: 
: 
: 
: 
: 
: 
: 
: 
: 
: 
: 
: 
Narrator:

Voice actors
, : 
, : , 
: 
: 
: 
: 
:

Guest actors
:

Songs
Opening themes

Lyrics: 
Composition & Arrangement: 
Artist: Ryu Manatsu, 
Episodes: 1-13

Lyrics: Yu Aku
Composition & Arrangement: Makoto Kawaguchi 
Artist: , Mizuumi Boys and Girls Choir (Tokyo Records)
Episodes: 14-51

Insert themes

Lyrics: Yū Aku 
Composition & Arrangement: Makoto Kawaguchi 
Artist: Ryu Manatsu, Mizuumi Boys and Girl Choir (Tokyo Records)
Episodes: 4

Lyrics: Yū Aku 
Composition & Arrangement: Makoto Kawaguchi 
Artist: Ryu Manatsu (Tokyo Records)
Episodes: 1, 10, 51

Other appearances
Besides the Shōwa period, Ultraman Leo's popularity and fighting ability enabled him to make guest appearances in the following Ultra Series after the end of the original TV series.
 Princess Comet: Guest appearances in episode 63.
 Ultraman: Great Monster Decisive Battle, Ultraman Story, Ultraman Zoffy: Ultra Warriors vs. the Giant Monster Army, Ultraman vs. Kamen Rider: All these movies used Leo's stock footage in the original series.
 Ultraman Mebius: Appeared in episode 1, 34, and 50. Ultraman Leo returns in Ultraman Mebius episode 34, "A Man Without a Home to help", in his human form Gen Ohtori. He trained and helped Mebius to defeat Alien Reflect.
 Mega Monster Battle: Ultra Galaxy, Ultra Galaxy Legend Side Story: Ultraman Zero vs. Darklops Zero, Ultraman Zero: The Revenge of Belial and Ultraman Saga: See here
 Ultraman Ginga, Ultraman Ginga S The Movie and Ultra Fight Victory: See here
 Ultraman X: See here
 Ultraman Geed: here

International broadcast
In Thailand, Ultraman Leo first aired in 1995 on IBC7 (now called TrueVisions).

Home media

Japan
In December 2018, Tsuburaya Productions and Bandai Namco Entertainment released the series on Blu-ray.

North America
In November 2014, the series, along with Ultraman Max and Ultraman Mebius, began streaming on Crunchyroll. In December 2017, the series was released on the streaming service Toku. In April 2018, Shout! Factory hosted a marathon event of the series on their streaming service Shout! Factory TV.

In July 2020, Shout! Factory announced to have struck a multi-year deal with Alliance Entertainment and Mill Creek, with the blessings of Tsuburaya and Indigo, that granted them the exclusive SVOD and AVOD digital rights to the Ultra series and films (1,100 TV episodes and 20 films) acquired by Mill Creek the previous year. Ultraman Leo, amongst other titles, will stream in the United States and Canada through Shout! Factory TV and Tokushoutsu.

It was released on Blu-ray in the United States on May 25, 2021 by Mill Creek.

Notes

References

External links

Official website of Tsuburaya Productions 
Ultraman Connection — Official website 
Official Ultraman channel at YouTube

1974 Japanese television series debuts
1975 Japanese television series endings
Ultra television series
 
TBS Television (Japan) original programming
Television duos